Ahtna, Incorporated is one of thirteen Alaska Native Regional Corporations created under the Alaska Native Claims Settlement Act of 1971 (ANCSA) in settlement of aboriginal land claims. Ahtna, Incorporated was incorporated in Alaska on June 23, 1972.  Headquartered in Glennallen, Alaska, Ahtna is a for-profit corporation with more than 2,000 Alaska Native shareholders primarily of Ahtna Athabascan descent.

The Ahtna region is located primarily in the Copper River Census Area of Alaska, with a small spillover into the neighboring Denali Borough in the area of Cantwell.

Officers and Directors
A current listing of Ahtna, Inc.'s officers and directors, as well as documents filed with the State of Alaska since Ahtna's incorporation, are available online through the Corporations Database of the Division of Corporations, Business & Professional Licensing, Alaska Department of Commerce, Community and Economic Development.

Shareholders
At incorporation, Ahtna enrolled approximately 1,000 Alaska Natives, each of whom received 100 shares of Ahtna stock. As an ANCSA corporation, Ahtna has no publicly traded stock and its shares cannot legally be sold.

The corporation has over 2,000 shareholders, all of whom are Alaska Natives.

Lands

Eight villages are contained within the Ahtna region, including Cantwell, Chistochina, Chitina, Gakona, Gulkana, Mentasta, the Native Village of Kluti-Kaah (Copper Center), and Tazlina. Under the terms of ANCSA,  of land surrounding the villages were allocated to the village corporations established for those villages.

In 1980, seven of the eight village corporations in the Ahtna region merged with Ahtna.  These included the village corporations Yedatene Na Corporation (Cantwell), Cheesh-Na, Incorporated (Chistochina), Gakona Corporation (Gakona), Sta-Keh Corporation (Gulkana), Kluti-Kaah Corporation (Kluti-Kaah in Copper Center), Mentasta, Incorporated (Mentasta), and Tazlina, Incorporated (Tazlina). Ahtna assumed management of the lands of the seven merged corporations; however, under terms of the merger agreement, the former village corporations were permitted to maintain shareholder committees known as Successor Village Organizations (SVO) each of which retains the right to reasonably withhold consent to new development of former village lands.

Chitina Native Corporation (in Chitina) chose not to merge with Ahtna, and retains rights to the surface estate of its lands. Rights to the subsurface estate of its lands are with Ahtna, Inc., per the requirements of ANCSA.

 Surface estate (including gravel), timber, and subsurface estate is managed by the Ahtna, Inc. Land Department.

Business enterprises
Ahtna Netiye', LLC, the holding company of Ahtna, Inc. manages the operating subsidiaries, all of which are wholly owned. These subsidiary companies are involved in a number of corporate activities, including civil and vertical construction, environmental remediation, facilities management and support services, government contracting, and oil and gas pipeline maintenance and construction. Ahtna Netiye', LLC is headquartered in Anchorage, Alaska.

Under federal law, Ahtna and its majority-owned subsidiaries, joint ventures and partnerships are deemed to be a "minority and economically disadvantaged business enterprise[s]" (43 USC 1626(e)).

Citations

See also
 Copper River Native Association Non-profit organization
 Ahtna Lands Information regarding lands Ahtna, Inc. received under ANCSA

External links
Ahtna, Incorporated (official website)

1972 establishments in Alaska
Alaska Native regional corporations